The Uralsk electoral district was a constituency created for the 1917 Russian Constituent Assembly election. The electoral district covered the Ural Oblast as well as the Mangyshlak uezd of the Transcaspian Oblast (except for areas inhabited by Turkmens).

In Uralsk town 11,827 out of 25,163 eligible voters cast their ballots; the Cossack list got 7,248 votes, the Peasants' Deputies list 2,737 votes, the Kirghiz (Alash Party) list 976 votes and the SR list 866 votes. In Lbishchensky uezd the Alash list obtained 75,542 votes.

Results

References

Electoral districts of the Russian Constituent Assembly election, 1917